One World Media is a non-profit organisation, registered in the UK as a charitable trust. It is based in London. The charities mission is to support strong vibrant and independent media that empowers citizens, promotes justice and contributes to international development. 

The charities activities include: The One World Media Awards, OWM Fellowship, Global Short Docs Forum and OWM Global Reporting Summit.

One World Media Awards
The One World Media Awards are for journalists and filmmakers who work on underreported stories from the global south. They recognise excellence in media coverage of the global south and its social and cultural life. They are presented annually in a ceremony in London. These prizes were described by news presenter Jon Snow as "the awards that people in the industry really want to win".

2022 Awards

The 2022 winners were recognised with an online nominees party and live event at BAFTA in London on 16 June 2022. Nominees from Bosnia, Nepal, India, Poland, France travelled to attend in person.

The Special Award was presented to TOLOnews.

2012 Awards
The One World Media Awards 2012 (24th year) took place on the evening of 8 May at Kings Place, London.

2013 Awards
The 25th annual One World Media Awards took place on Tuesday 7 May at Kings Place in London.

Staff, trustees and patrons
The current director is Gemma Bradshaw.

The Trustees of One World Media are: 

Samir Shah, Chief Executive and Creative Director of Juniper TV. (Chair)
Charlotte Alfred, Investigative journalist and editor.
Victoria Bridges, Documentary Producer & Director.
Godfrey Cromwell, Member of the House of Lords.
Juan Flames, Managing Director, Barclays
Monica Garnsey, Executive Producer in TV Current Affairs
Joel Kibazo, Founding Partner, JK Associates
Muriel Lamin, Head of Business Development, BBC World Service
Liliane Landor, Head of Foreign News, Channel 4
Carol Nahra, Professor, Journalist and Producer

Current patrons of One World Media include Jon Snow. 
Previous patrons Zeinab Badawi, Michael Buerk and Jonathan Dimbleby.

References

External links
Official site
Media coverage of One World Media Awards 2011 by the Guardian
Media coverage of One World Media Awards 2011 by BBC Ariel

Development charities based in the United Kingdom
Organisations based in the London Borough of Southwark